Topli Vrh may refer to more than one place in Slovenia: 

Topli Vrh, Črnomelj, a former settlement in the Municipality of Črnomelj
Topli Vrh, Semič, a former settlement in the Municipality of Semič